Bader Nasser Al-Kharafi (born 17 August 1977) is a Kuwaiti businessman. He is the Vice chairman and Group chief executive officer of Kuwait's Zain Group.

In 2018, he was ranked as one of the 100 most influential Arabs list by Arabian Business.

Early life and education
Al-Kharafi was born on 17 August 1977. He received his bachelor's degree in mechanical engineering from Kuwait University in 2002. In 2016, he completed his MBA from London Business School.

Career
After graduation, Al-Kharafi joined Kuwait Petroleum Corporation (KPC). He joined M.A & Al-Kharafi group in 2002 and started working as a Coordination Engineer. He currently holds senior management positions at Gulf Bank of Kuwait, Foulath Holding, Diamond International Motors, and Gulf Cable & Electrical Industries.

After the death of his father, Nasser Al-Kharafi, he assumed the directorship of the Al Kharafi groups' executive committee in 2012.

In early 2014, he joined the Middle East Advisory Board of Coutts. In the same year, Zain KSA, a subsidiary of Zain Group appointed Al-Kharafi as its Vice Chairman.

In 2017, Al-Kharafi became the CEO of Zain Group, replacing the Scott Gegenheimer.

In February 2019, he became the Chairman of the Board of the Executive Committee and a member of the Board of Nomination and Remuneration Committee of Boursa Kuwait, the country's stock exchange.

In September 2019, BNK Automotive owned by Al-Kharafi signed a new Volvo agency agreement in Kuwait making BNK Automotive the exclusive importer for Volvo Cars into Kuwait. In November 2019, Al-Kharafi acquired a controlling stake in Gulf Cable by purchasing 29 percent of the company's shares reported to be worth around US$500 million.

Awards and recognition

 In 2014, Al-Kharafi has been featured in the World's 100 Most Powerful Arabs 2014 by Gulf Business.
 In 2015, Al-Kharafi ranked as one of the Most Powerful Young Arabs Under 40 in Arabian Business.
 In 2017 and 2018, Al-Kharafi was listed in the 100 World's Most Influential Arabs feature by Arabian Business.

Philanthropy
Al-Kharafi is associated with Kuwait Food Bank which is involved in providing nutritious meals to the poor in Kuwait and creating public awareness on lessening food waste. More than 5,700 Kuwaiti families are said to have benefited from this initiative. The food bank also provides skills and training to the members of poor families so that they can find decent employment in Kuwait.

He offers support and guidance to Kuwaiti youth through INJAZ Kuwait.

Additionally, the recent launch of WE ABLE in the year 2019, Al-Kharafi is leading Zain's Disability Inclusion Program which aims to position Zain Group as Disability Inclusive by 2022.

References

Kuwaiti businesspeople
Kuwaiti billionaires
Kuwaiti Sunni Muslims
20th-century Kuwaiti businesspeople
1977 births
Alumni of London Business School
Living people